The fourteenth season of the One Piece anime series was produced by Toei Animation, and directed by Hiroaki Miyamoto. The season began broadcasting in Japan on Fuji Television on July 18, 2010 and ended on September 25, 2011. The season focuses on Monkey D. Luffy as he tries to save his brother Portgas D. Ace. It contains two story arcs. The first is titled , which mainly adapts the 56th to 59th volumes of the material from the One Piece manga by Eiichiro Oda. The second story arc, which is also titled , also adapts material from the 59th to 61st volumes of the manga.

The season deals with the war between the Marines and Whitebeard's pirates. Focusing on Luffy, Jimbei, and the escaped convicts from Impel Down as they infiltrate Marineford to save Ace. Eventually, Luffy must decide on whether to continue training or go back to Sabaody to see his friends once again. The first DVD compilation was released on October 5, 2011.

The season used three pieces of theme music. The first opening theme, titled  and performed by Mari Yaguchi with the Straw Hats, continues to be used for the first two episodes. The second opening theme, from episodes 459 to 492, is "One Day" performed by The Rootless. The third opening theme, from episodes 493 to 516, is "Fight Together" performed by Namie Amuro.


Episode list

Home releases

Japanese

English 
In North America, the season was recategorized as the majority of "Season Eight" for its DVD release by Funimation Entertainment. The Australian Season Eight sets were renamed Collection 38 through 42. Episode 492, the Toriko crossover, was omitted from the English home video releases.

Notes

References 

2010 Japanese television seasons
2011 Japanese television seasons
One Piece seasons
One Piece episodes